Khardiata "Khady" Sourangué Diop (also spelled Khadidiatou) (born 7 November 1971 in Dakar, Senegal) is a Senegalese former basketball player who competed in the 2000 Summer Olympics.

References

1971 births
Living people
Basketball players from Dakar
Senegalese women's basketball players
Centers (basketball)
Olympic basketball players of Senegal
Basketball players at the 2000 Summer Olympics